Vladimir Sergeyevich Bystrov (born 31 January 1984) is a Russian former footballer who played as a right winger.

Career

FC Zenit Saint Petersburg
Bystrov began his career in youth club Smena. In 2001, he transferred to Zenit. On 8 May 2002, he made his debut in the Zenit squad. In 2005, he felt dissatisfied because he lost his place in squad and played less than he wanted. After a scandal with Zenith's hierarchy, he transferred to FC Spartak Moscow.

FC Spartak Moscow
In June 2005, he moved to Spartak for 4 million euro. Zenit fans were disappointed, because Spartak was their principal opponent. He made his debut for Spartak on 9 June. In 2009, he became a leader of Spartak with help of Alex and Welliton.

FC Zenit Saint Petersburg
On 27 August 2009, after four seasons with Zenit's archrivals Spartak Moscow, the winger suddenly returned to his former club, signing until June 2014.

Due to his spell at rivals Spartak Moscow, Zenit supporters still can't find it in their hearts to forgive and direct jeers towards him at their games.
In March 2010, Zenit was to be rewarded for finishing third in the Russian championship by the city of Saint Petersburg, but the ceremony ended with the players storming off the stage after Bystrov had been heckled by parts of the audience.

FC Krasnodar
After finishing his mid-season loan spell with newly relegated FC Anzhi Makhachkala, Bystrov joined FC Krasnodar on a three-year contract on 9 June 2014. Bystrov left Krasnodar at the end of his contract.

Tosno
On 8 August 2017, he signed a one-year contract with FC Tosno.

International team
His first appearance for the Russia was in March 2004.
Bystrov made a big impact in the seven Euro 2008 qualifiers he played in, with his two goals so important to the Russian cause. His displays have not gone unnoticed in the last couple of years and he has been linked with moves to both England's Premier League and Germany's Bundesliga. Bystrov was included in Guus Hiddink's Euro 2008 squad. He was a substitute in Russia's opening match, the 4–1 defeat to Spain, coming on for Dmitri Sychev in the 46th minute before being swapped for Roman Adamov in the 70th.

He was left out of Fabio Capello's Russian squad for the World Cup in Brazil. He was one of the seven provisional players not included in the final 23.

Career statistics

Club

Notes

International goals

Career honours

Club
Zenit Saint Petersburg
 Russian Premier League: 2010, 2011–12
 Russian Cup: 2009–10
 Russian Super Cup: 2011
 Russian Premier League Cup: 2003
Tosno
 Russian Cup: 2017–18

International
Russia
 UEFA European Championship bronze medalist: 2008

References

External links
 Club profile

1984 births
Living people
People from Luga, Leningrad Oblast
Russian footballers
Russia under-21 international footballers
Russia national football B team footballers
Russia international footballers
FC Zenit Saint Petersburg players
FC Spartak Moscow players
FC Anzhi Makhachkala players
FC Krasnodar players
FC Tosno players
UEFA Euro 2004 players
Russian Premier League players
Association football wingers
UEFA Euro 2008 players
Sportspeople from Leningrad Oblast